Novoyamashevo (Yañı Yamaş) is a rural locality (a village) in Krivle-Ilyushkinsky Selsoviet, Kuyurgazinsky District, Bashkortostan, Russia. The population was 71 as of 2010. There are 2 streets.

Geography 
Novoyamashevo is located 23 km east of Yermolayevo (the district's administrative centre) by road. Znamenka is the nearest rural locality.

References 

Rural localities in Kuyurgazinsky District